Tia Powell is an American psychiatrist and bioethicist. She is Director of the Montefiore-Einstein Center for Bioethics and of the Einstein Cardozo Master of Science in Bioethics Program, as well as a Professor of Clinical Epidemiology and Clinical Psychiatry at the Albert Einstein College of Medicine in The Bronx, New York. She holds the Trachtenberg Chair in Bioethics and is Professor of Epidemiology, Division of Bioethics, and Psychiatry. She was previously executive director of the New York State Task Force on Life and the Law and director of Clinical Ethics at Columbia-Presbyterian Hospital in New York City.

Powell graduated from Harvard University and Yale Medical School.

In 2007, she chaired a workgroup that developed New York State guidelines to allocate ventilators during a flu pandemic.  She has served on a number of committees for the Institute of Medicine, especially focusing on ethical issues in the management of public health disasters. She worked with the Institute of Medicine on 5 separate projects related to public health disasters, including as co-chair of the IOM report on antibiotics for anthrax attack. She has bioethics expertise in public policy, dementia, consultation, end of life care, decision-making capacity, bioethics education and the ethics of public health disasters.

Dementia Reimagined
In 2019, Penguin Random House published Dementia Reimagined: Building a Life of Joy and Dignity from Beginning to End. Dementia Reimagined is a moving combination of medicine and memoir, peeling back the untold history of dementia, from the story of Solomon Fuller, a black doctor whose research at the turn of the twentieth century anticipated important aspects of what we know about dementia today, to what has been gained and lost with the recent bonanza of funding for Alzheimer's at the expense of other forms of the disease.

References

External links
Allocation of Ventilators in an Influenza Pandemic, Report of New York State Task Force on Life and the Law, 2007.
Guidelines for Epidemics, The New York Times, March 26, 2008
The Coming Ethical Crisis:  Oxygen Rationing

Bioethicists
Yale School of Medicine alumni
Harvard University alumni
Living people
NewYork–Presbyterian Hospital physicians
Yeshiva University faculty
Albert Einstein College of Medicine faculty
Place of birth missing (living people)
American psychiatrists
American women psychiatrists
American ethicists
1957 births
American women academics
21st-century American women